David Nata (18 March 1951 – 22 December 1982) was a Zambian boxer. He competed in the men's light flyweight event at the 1968 Summer Olympics. At the 1968 Summer Olympics, he lost to Tahar Aziz of Morocco.

References

1951 births
1982 deaths
Zambian male boxers
Olympic boxers of Zambia
Boxers at the 1968 Summer Olympics
People from Kitwe
Light-flyweight boxers